Sasaram Assembly constituency is one of 243 legislative assembly of legislative assembly of Bihar. It is comes under Sasaram lok sabha constituency.

Overview
Sasaram comprises community blocks of Sasaram & Tilouthu. 
Earlier Rohtas block and Nauhatta block also came under the Sasaram assembly constituency but after the delimitation of 2009 these two blocks began comprising Chenari Vidhansabha.

Social equation
Sasaram constituency is dominated by Kushwahas, as a result of which from 1980 to 2015, in all the assembly elections, only candidates belonging to this caste group has been elected from this constituency. The victory of Ram Sewak Singh in 1980 bihar assembly elections was followed by victory of only kushwaha candidates from this seat and from the 1990 onwards, the second  as well as third runner-ups were also from the same caste. As a result of this, all the political parties started fielding only those candidates, who belonged to this caste group.

Members of Legislative Assembly

Election Results

2020

See also
 List of constituencies of Bihar Legislative Assembly

References

External links
 

Politics of Rohtas district
Assembly constituencies of Bihar